Bergens Adressecontoirs Efterretninger was a Norwegian newspaper, published in Bergen county.

Bergens Adressecontoirs Efterretninger was started in 1765. It went defunct in 1889, when it was incorporated into Bergens Aftenblad.

References

1765 establishments in Norway
1889 disestablishments in Norway
Defunct newspapers published in Norway
Newspapers published in Bergen
Norwegian-language newspapers
Publications established in 1765
Publications disestablished in 1889